Tegula luctuosa is a species of sea snail, a marine gastropod mollusk in the family Tegulidae.

Description
The height of the shell attains 35 mm, its diameter 44 mm. The solid, heavy shell is depressed, broadly umbilicate, and has a conoidal shape. It is black or purplish. The spire is more or less depressed. The sutures are linear. The shell contains 5 to 6 whorls. The upper ones have a strong carina midway between the sutures. The body whorl is carinated at the periphery and above, generally showing a less prominent carina on the base near the periphery. The aperture is oblique. The arcuate columella is oblique. The umbilicus is broad and deep, with a spiral rib within. This species is characterized by its wide umbilicus and strongly keeled whorls.

Distribution
This species occurs in the Pacific Ocean between Peru and Chile.

References

External links
 World Register of Marine Species
 

luctuosa
Gastropods described in 1841